John Robb may refer to:
John Robb (1862–1913), Scottish civil engineer
John Robb (author) (born 1962), American author, military analyst and entrepreneur
John Robb (civil engineer) (1834–1896), Ireland-born contractor and businessman in Australia
John Robb (musician) (born 1961), British journalist and vocalist for punk band Goldblade
John D. Robb, Chairman of the International Prayer Council
John Donald Robb (1892–1989), American composer and ethnomusicologist
Jimmy Robb or John "Jimmy" Robb (born 1935), Scottish footballer
John Robb (surgeon) (c. 1933–2018), Northern Irish surgeon and politician who served in Seanad Éireann, 1982–1989
John Hanna Robb (1873–1956), Northern Irish politician
John Morrow Robb (1876–1942), physician and politician in Ontario, Canada